The Major Rock Edicts of Indian Emperor Ashoka refer to 14 separate major Edicts of Ashoka which are significantly detailed and represent some of the earliest dated rock inscriptions of any Indian monarch. These edicts are preceded chronologically by the Minor Rock Edicts.

History
Ashoka was the third monarch of the Maurya Empire in India, reigning from around 269 BCE. Ashoka famously converted to Buddhism and renounced violence soon after being victorious in a gruesome Kalinga War, yet filled with deep remorse for the bloodshed of the war. Although he was a major historical figure, little definitive information was known as there were few records of his reign until the 19th century when a large number of his edicts, inscribed on rocks and pillars, were found in India, Nepal, Pakistan and Afghanistan. In India, Places where rock edicts were found are – Kalsi, Uttarakhand; Sopara, Maharashtra; Mount Girnar, Gujarat; Yerragudi, Andhra Pradesh; Dhauli, Odisha; Jaugada, Odisha. These many edicts, of which Ashoka's Major Rock Edicts were the first and most impressive, were concerned with practical instructions in running a kingdom such as the design of irrigation systems and descriptions of Ashoka's beliefs in peaceful moral behavior. They contain little personal detail about his life.

Authorship
The Major Rock Edicts are very generally attributed to Ashoka. Strictly speaking though, the inscriptions of the Major Rock Edicts, just as those of the Major Pillar Edicts, are not inscribed in the name of "Ashoka", but in the name of "Devanampriya" ("Beloved of the God", thought to be a general regnal title like "Our Lord"), "Devanampriya Priyadasi" ("Our Lord Priyadasi", or literally "Our Lord who glances amicably") or "Devanampriya Priyadasi Raja" ("Our Lord the King Priyadasi"). This title also appears in Greek in the Kandahar Bilingual Rock Inscription, when naming the author of the proclamation as βασιλεὺς Πιοδασσης ("King Piyodasses"), and in Aramaic in the same inscription as "our lord, king Priyadasin".

The association of the Major inscriptions with "Ashoka" is only a reconstruction based on the 3rd-4th century CE Dipavamsa which associates the name "Ashoka" with the name "Priyadarsi", and an extrapolation based on the fact that the name "Ashoka" appears with the title "Devanampriya" ("Beloved of the Gods") in a few of the Minor Rock Edicts. Christopher Beckwith has suggested that "Priyadarsi" was a king in his own right, probably the son of Chandragupta Maurya known to the Greeks as Amitrochates, and Ashoka was either just a Buddhist legend or a much later king who authored the Buddhist Minor Rock Edicts around the 1st century CE.

Conversely, the Major Rock Edicts in the name of King Priyadasi do not have a clear Buddhist character, being mainly codes of conduct gathered under the name of "Dharma" (translated as Eusebeia ("Piety") in Greek and "Truth" in Aramaic in the Kandahar Bilingual Rock Inscription), and never mentioning Buddhism, the Buddha or the Sangha.

List of Major Rock edicts

The major rock edits of Ashoka include:

 Rock Edict I
 Prohibits animal slaughter. Bans festive gatherings and killings of animals. Only two peacocks and one deer were killed in Asoka’s kitchen. He wished to discontinue this practice of killing two peacocks and one deer as well.

 Major Rock Edict II
 Provides for care for man and animals, describes recipients as the Chola, Pandyas, Satyaputra and Cheras Kingdoms of South India, and the Greek king Antiochus II and his neighbours.

 Major Rock Edict III
 Generosity to Brahmans. Issued after 12 years of Asoka’s coronation. It says that the Yuktas (subordinate officers) and Pradesikas (district Heads) along with Rajukas (Rural officers) shall go to the all areas of kingdom every five years and spread the Dhamma Policy of Asoka.

 Major Rock Edict IV  Dhammaghosa is ideal to the mankind and not the Bherighosa. Impact of Dhamma on society.

 Major Rock Edict V
 Concerns about the policy towards slaves. He mentions in this rock edict "Every Human is my child". Appointment of Dhammamahamatras is mentioned in this edict.

 Major Rock Edict VI
 Describes King’s desire to get informed about the conditions of the people constantly. Talks about welfare measures.

 Major Rock Edict VII
 Requests tolerance for all religions - "To foster one’s own sect, depreciating the others out of affection for one’s own, to exalt its merit, is to do the worst harm to one’s own sect."

 Major Rock Edict VIII
 Describes Asoka’s first Dhamma Yatra to Bodhgaya & Bodhi Tree.

 Major Rock Edict IX
 Condemns popular ceremonies. Stress in ceremonies of Dhamma.

 Major Rock Edict X
 Condemns the desire for fame and glory. Stresses on popularity of Dhamma.

 Major Rock Edict XI
 Elaborates Dhamma Major

 Rock Edict XII
 Directed and determined request for tolerance among different religious sects. 
 Also written in Greek in the Kandahar Greek Edict of Ashoka (last portion)

 Major Rock Edict XIII
 It is the largest inscription from the edict. It talks about the Ashoka's victory over Kalinga and also mentions about the high number of casualties in that war. King considered the victory by "Dhamma" to be the foremost victory; mentions the victory of "Dhamma" where the Greek being named Amtiyoga or Amtiyaka (𑀅𑀁𑀢𑀺𑀬𑀓), identified with Antiochus II Theos of the Seleucid Empire, rules; it also mentions the victory of Dhamma where rule the following Greek kings beyond Antiochus:
 Tulamaya (𑀢𑀼𑀭𑀫𑀸𑀬), identified with Ptolemy III Euergetes of Egypt
 Antekina (𑀅𑀁𑀢𑁂𑀓𑀺𑀦), identified with Antigonus Gonatus of Macedonia
 Maka (identified with Magas of Cyrene)
 Alikyashudala (identified with Alexander I of Epirus)
It also mentions the victory of Dhamma in south India among the Cholas and Pandyas, as far as Ceylon.
 This edict was also written in Greek (probably together with all the other Major Rock Edicts I-XIV originally) in the Kandahar Greek Edict of Ashoka (first portion recovered).

 Major Rock Edict XIV
 Describes engraving of inscriptions in different parts of country.

Language of the Inscriptions 
 
Three languages and four scripts were used. The edicts in the Indian language are composed in non-standardized and archaic forms of Prakrit. Prakrit inscriptions were written in Brahmi and Kharosthi scripts, which even a commoner could read and understand, the inscriptions found in the area of Pakistan using in the Kharosthi script. A few northern Edicts are written in the Greek language, using very standardized Greek script, or in the Aramaic language, using the Aramaic script. The Kandahar Rock Inscription is bilingual Greek-Aramaic (but more often categorized as a Minor Rock Edict). The Kandahar Greek Edict of Ashoka is in Greek only, and originally probably contained all the Major Rock Edicts 1-14.

Ashoka's edicts were the first written inscriptions in India after the ancient city of Harrapa fell to ruin.

Limited Buddhist character of the Major Rock Edicts
Several authors have pointed out that the Major Rock Edicts do not have a very strong Buddhist flavour, in particular compared to the Minor Rock Edicts. The subject of the Major Rock Edicts is the Dharma, which is essentially described as a corpus of moral and social values ("compassion, liberality, thruthfulness, purity, gentleness, goodness, few sins, many virtuous deeds") and neither the Buddha, nor the Samgha, nor Buddhism are ever mentioned. The only likely mention of Buddhism only appears with the word "Sramanas" ("ascetics"), who are always mentioned next to "Brahmanas", in what appears as a rather neutral enumeration of the major religious actors of the period. In the 12th Major Rock Edict, Ashoka also claims to be honouring all sects.

In Major Rock Edict No.8 though, Ashoka unambiguously describes his pilgrimage to Sambodhi ( Saṃ+bodhi, “Complete Enlightenment”), another name of Bodh Gaya, the location of the Buddha's awakening. Ashoka also repeatedly condemns ceremonies and sacrifices, an apparent attack on Brahmanism. In the Major Rock Edicts Ashoka also expresses his belief in karma and rebirth, affirming that good deeds with be rewarded in this life and the next, in Heaven (𑀲𑁆𑀯𑀕 svaga).

Overall, according to Christopher I. Beckwith, the author of the Major Rock Edicts probably adhered to an "early, pietistic, popular" form of Buddhism.

Description of the Major Rock Edicts
The Major Rock Edicts of Ashoka are inscribed on large rocks, except for the Kandahar version in Greek (Kandahar Greek Edict of Ashoka), written on a stone plaque belonging to a building. The Major Edicts are not located in the heartland of Mauryan territory, traditionally centered on Bihar, but on the frontiers of the territory controlled by Ashoka.

Content of the Edicts
There are altogether 14 Major Rocks Edicts, forming a group which is duplicated with only slight variations in 10 known locations, and two Separate Major Rock Edicts, in Dhauli and Jaugada.

Major Rock Edict 1
Asoka’s prohibition of festivals and respect of animal life.

Major Rock Edict 2
Asoka’s providing of medical services, for human and animals, as well as herbs and fruit plants, to kings on his borders, including Hellenistic kings.

Major Rock Edict 3
Rules of morality and their implementation through Civil Servants.

Major Rock Edict 4
Rules of morality.

Major Rock Edict 5
Establishment and role of the Mahamatras.

Major Rock Edict 6
Ashoka' management of government affairs.

Major Rock Edict 7
The importance of self-control, purity of mind, gratitude, and firm devotion.

Major Rock Edict 8

Morality tours by Ashoka.

This Edict is remarkable in that it describes the visit of the king to Sambodhi ( Saṃ+bodhi, “Complete Enlightenment”), another name of Bodh Gaya. It is thought that Ashoka built in Bodh Gaya the Diamond Throne, in order to mark the place where the Buddha reached enlightenment.

According to tradition, Ashoka was profoundly grieved when he discovered that the sacred pipal tree was not properly being taken care of and dying out due to the neglect of Queen Tiṣyarakṣitā. As a consequence, Ashoka endeavoured to take care of the Bodhi Tree, and built a temple around it. This temple became the center of Bodh Gaya. A sculpture at Sanchi, southern gateway of Stupa No1, shows Ashoka in grief being supported by his two Queens. Then the relief above shows the Bodhi Tree prospering inside its new temple. Numerous other sculptures at Sanchi show scenes of devotion towards the Bodhi Tree, and the Bodhi Tree inside its temple at Bodh Gaya.

The Kalsi version also uses the title "Devanampriyas" to describe previous kings (whereas the other versions use the term "Kings"), suggesting that the title "Denampriya" had a rather wide usage and might just have meant "King".

Major Rock Edict 9
Morality rather than ceremonies.

Major Rock Edict 10
Strive for merit.

Major Rock Edict 11
Morality, courtesy, meritorious deeds.

Major Rock Edict 12
Respect other sects and not take pride in one's own.

Major Rock Edict 13

Content: Asoka’s victory in the Kalinga war followed by remorse. Victory of morality in India and among the Greeks (Yonas), as far as where the Greek kings Antiochus, Ptolemy, Antigonus, Magas and Alexander rule.

The kings mentioned in Edict 13 as following the Dharma have been identified with the major Hellenistic rulers of the period:

Major Rock Edict 14
Objectives and modalities of inscriptions.

First Separate Major Rock Edict
In Dhauli and Jaugada, on the east coast of India, in the recently conquered territory of Kalinga, Major Rock Edicts 11 to 13 were omitted from the normal complement of Edicts from 1 to 14, but two separate Edicts were put in their place. The First Separate Major Rock Edicts mainly addresses local officials (from Tosali in the Dhauli Separate Edicts and from Somāpā in the Jaugada versions) referring to the requirements of a fair judicial system, and the system of control established by Ashoka through the Mahamatras, sent from Pataliputra, Ujjain and Taxila.

Chronologically, it seems that the First Separate Rock Edict was actually engraved after the Second Separate Rock Edict. The first and second separate edicts seem to have been inscribed at about the same time as the other Major Rock Edicts, in the 13th and 14th years of Ashoka's reign.

Second Separate Major Rock Edict
In Dhauli and Jaugada, on the east coast of India, in the recently conquered territory of Kalinga, Major Rock Edicts 11 to 13 were omitted, but another separate Edict was put in their place, the Second Separate Major Rock Edict, addressed to the officials of Tosali in the Dhauli Separate Edicts and of Somāpā in the Jaugada versions. The Second Separate Edict asks the local officials to try to convince "unconquered bordering tribes" that the intentions of Ashoka towards them are benevolent.

See also

 Related topics
 Ancient iron production
 Dhar iron pillar
 History of metallurgy in South Asia
 Iron pillar of Delhi
 List of Edicts of Ashoka 
 Pillars of Ashoka
 Stambha
 Other similar topics
 Early Indian epigraphy
 Hindu temple architecture
 History of India 
 Indian copper plate inscriptions
 Indian rock-cut architecture 
 List of rock-cut temples in India 
 Outline of ancient India
 South Indian Inscriptions
 Tagundaing

References

External links

 On The Origin Of The Early Indian Scripts

Indian inscriptions
History of Gujarat
Linguistic history of India
Edicts of Ashoka
Memorials to Ashoka
Tourist attractions in Junagadh district
Junagadh